All This, and Heaven Too is a 1940 American drama film made by Warner Bros.-First National Pictures, produced and directed by Anatole Litvak with Hal B. Wallis as executive producer. The screenplay was adapted by Casey Robinson from the 1938 novel by Rachel Field. The music was by Max Steiner and the cinematography by Ernie Haller. The film stars Bette Davis and Charles Boyer with Barbara O'Neil, Jeffrey Lynn, Virginia Weidler, Helen Westley, Walter Hampden, Henry Daniell, Harry Davenport, George Coulouris, Montagu Love, Janet Beecher and June Lockhart.

Rachel Field's novel is based on the true story of Field's great-aunt, Henriette Deluzy-Desportes, a French governess who fell in love with the Duc de Praslin, her employer. When Praslin's wife was murdered, Henriette was implicated. It was a real-life scandal that contributed to the political turmoil before the French Revolution of 1848 which deposed France's Louis Philippe I.

Plot

Mademoiselle Henriette Deluzy-Desportes, a French woman, starts teaching at an American girls school. She is confronted by the tales and gossip about her that circulate among her pupils and, thus provoked, she decides to tell them her life story.

Deluzy-Desportes is governess to the four children of the Duc and Duchesse de Praslin in Paris during the last years of the Orleans monarchy. As a result of the Duchesse's constantly erratic and temperamental behavior, all that remains is an unhappy marriage, but the Duc remains with his wife for sake of their children.

Deluzy-Desportes, with her warmth and kindness, wins the love and affection of the children and their father, but also the jealousy and hatred of their mother. She is forced to leave and the Duchess refuses to give her a letter of recommendation to future employers. The Duc confronts his wife and she invents alternative letters taking opposite attitudes, which in fact she has not written and does not intend to write. Her account enrages him and, at the breaking point, he kills her.

The Duc de Praslin is in a privileged position; as a peer his case can only be heard by other nobles. He refuses to confess his guilt or openly to admit his love for his employee, knowing that his fellow nobles wish to use such an admission to blame her for the murder by declaring that he was acting at her bidding. Ultimately the Duc takes poison to prevent himself from ever publicly proclaiming his love for Henriette, since he knows that would convict her; however, he lives long enough to reveal it to another of his servants, Pierre, a kindly old man who had warned the governess to leave the de Praslin household. With the Duc's death, the authorities accept that they have no evidence upon which to base a judgment that Henriette solicited the murder and she is released.

Deluzy-Desportes had been recommended for the teaching position "in the land of the free" by an American minister, Rev. Henry Field, to whom she had expressed a loss of faith while in prison. He proposes marriage, and it is implied that Henriette will accept.

Cast

Reception
The film was positively reviewed by critics. Bosley Crowther of The New York Times wrote that film-goers willing to sit through the long running time "will find the film a source of much emotional satisfaction; others of less Spartan stamp will certainly protest that it wears out their patience in the telling of a comparatively uncomplicated tale. For the Warners are here handing out a tear-laden old-fashioned drama—and a very heavy one, too."

Variety called it "film theatre at its best...Casey Robinson in the scripting captured the quaintness of the manners and customs of Paris, in 1848, and succeeded admirably in retaining both spirit and characters of the novel, despite the necessity for much deletion of material." Film Daily'''s headline announced: "Dramatically powerful, beautifully mounted and superbly cast; film should be one of year's strongest box-office attractions." Harrison's Reports wrote: "A powerful drama, with a strong appeal for women. The production is lavish, and the direction and performances are of the highest order." John Mosher of The New Yorker wrote that Litvak had swung the viewer into the historical setting "with all the romantic, profuse gusto at his command. I think a few of the scenes of governess and children might have been elided, for, with the sinister doings in the background, we can't forever sustain a nursery mood. In general, though, the long picture seems short, which, of course, is something very much in its favor."All This, and Heaven Too placed fifth on Film Daily's year-end nationwide poll of 546 critics naming the best films of 1940.

A successful, but expensive costume drama,

Accolades

Home media
On April 1, 2008, Warner Home Video released the film as part of the box set The Bette Davis Collection, Volume 3''.

References

External links

 
 
 
 
 

1940 films
1940 romantic drama films
American romantic drama films
American black-and-white films
1940s English-language films
Films scored by Max Steiner
Films directed by Anatole Litvak
Films set in Paris
Films set in the United States
Films set in the 1840s
Warner Bros. films
Films based on American novels
Drama films based on actual events
Films produced by Hal B. Wallis
1940s American films